London Mills is a village in Fulton and Knox counties in the U.S. state of Illinois. The population was 392 at the 2010 census, down from 447 at the 2000 census.

The Fulton County portion of London Mills is part of the Canton Micropolitan Statistical Area and the wider Peoria Consolidated Statistical Area, while the Knox County portion is part of the Galesburg Micropolitan Statistical Area.

Geography
London Mills is located at  (40.711671, -90.267501), along the boundary between Fulton and Knox counties. In the 2000 census, 442 of London Mills' 447 residents (98.9%) lived in Fulton County and 5 (1.2%) lived in Knox County.

The village is bordered to the northwest by the Spoon River, a south-flowing tributary of the Illinois River. Illinois Route 116 forms the southern edge of the village. The highway leads east  to Farmington and west  to St. Augustine.

Demographics

As of the census of 2000, there were 447 people, 166 households, and 123 families residing in the village. The racial makeup of the village was 99.33% White, and 0.67% from two or more races. Hispanic or Latino of any race were 0.45% of the population.

There were 166 households, out of which 36.7% had children under the age of 18 living with them, 65.7% were married couples living together, 6.0% had a female householder with no husband present, and 25.9% were non-families. 21.1% of all households were made up of individuals, and 7.8% had someone living alone who was 65 years of age or older.  The average household size was 2.69 and the average family size was 3.18.

In the village, the population was spread out, with 30.4% under the age of 18, 5.1% from 18 to 24, 29.1% from 25 to 44, 21.9% from 45 to 64, and 13.4% who were 65 years of age or older.  The median age was 36 years. For every 100 females, there were 93.5 males.  For every 100 females age 18 and over, there were 95.6 males.

The median income for a household in the village was $38,125, and the median income for a family was $46,786. Males had a median income of $35,625 versus $25,833 for females. The per capita income for the village was $16,453.  About 5.4% of families and 9.3% of the population were below the poverty line, including 9.9% of those under age 18 and 5.7% of those age 65 or over.

Notable people

 Gale Schisler, US congressman (Illinois's 19th congressional district)

Schools
London Mills is home to Spoon River Valley Community Unit District 4. The schools include Spoon River Valley High School, Spoon River Valley Junior High School, and Spoon River Valley Elementary School. The facility is located east of town at the intersection of Illinois routes 97 and 116.

References

 

Villages in Fulton County, Illinois
Villages in Knox County, Illinois
Villages in Illinois
Galesburg, Illinois micropolitan area